Amylostereum ferreum is a species of crust fungus in the family Amylostereaceae.

References

External links

Russulales
Fungi described in 1869
Taxa named by Miles Joseph Berkeley